Mia Carlotta Sippel (born 26 July 2001) is a German field hockey player.

Career

Club level
In club competition, Sippel plays for Club an der Alster in the German Bundesliga.

Junior national team
Carlotta Sippel made her debut for the German U–21 team in 2019. Her first appearance was during a test series against Belgium in Cologne. Later that year, she went on to win a bronze medal with the team at the EuroHockey Junior Championship in Valencia.

In 2022, Sippel was named in the junior squad for the postponed FIH Junior World Cup in Potchefstroom.

Die Honamas
Sippel made her debut for Die Danas in 2019, during a test series against Argentina in Buenos Aires. 

She has since gone on to represent Germany in the FIH Pro League.

References

External links
 
 

2001 births
Living people
German female field hockey players
Female field hockey forwards
Der Club an der Alster players